Pangala is a village situated in Udupi taluk of Udupi district, Karnataka. India's National Highway number 66 (NH 66) connecting Mangalore (Kudla or Mangaluru) to Mumbai (Bombay) passes through this village. The village is on the north banks of Pangala river. The Pangala river joins Arabian sea near Mattu. The Shankarapura village which is famous for its jasmine flowers is nearby. The Janardhan temple of Pangala village has been renovated. One of the branches of Vijaya Bank is located in this village. According to the Indian Census of 2001, Pangala has a population of 1,948 (including 903 males, 1,045 females) in 438 households. Pangala Utsava is celebrated every year. Postal code for Pangala Post is 576122.

Pangala Belongs Kapu assembly constituency and Udupi Chikmagalur parliamentary constituency. The BICO is located in Pangala.

Demographics of Pangala 
Tulu is the Local Language here. Other than Tulu, people also Speak Kannada and Bearry.

Religious institutes 

 Hazrath Arabi Valiyullah Kaipunjal
Brahmalingeshwara Devastana Allade
Dandathirtha
Kothwala Guttu Naga Bana
Pangala Alade Temple

Transportation 
Padubidri Rail Way Station and Udupi Railway Station are the nearest railway stations to Pangala.

Udupi and Mulki are the nearest towns to Udupi having road connectivity to Udupi and Pangala.

References

External links
 Population of Pangala village

Villages in Udupi district